Deandra Jalisa Shakira Dottin (born 21 June 1991) is a Barbadian cricketer and former track and field athlete. A right-handed batter and right-arm fast bowler, Dottin made her debut for the West Indies women's cricket team in June 2008. She plays as a hard-hitting lower-order batter, and scored the first century in a Women's Twenty20 International in 2010. She played in her 100th Women's One Day International (WODI) match, when the West Indies played India in the group stage of the 2017 Women's Cricket World Cup, on 29 June 2017. She plays domestic cricket for Barbados, Trinbago Knight Riders and Adelaide Strikers, and has previously played for Trinidad and Tobago, Lancashire Thunder, London Spirit, North West Thunder, Perth Scorchers, Brisbane Heat, Trailblazers and Supernovas.

In June 2018, she was named the Women's T20 International Cricketer of the Year at the annual Cricket West Indies' Awards. In September 2018, she became the third woman to play in 100 Women's Twenty20 International (WT20I) matches, during the series against South Africa. In October 2018, Cricket West Indies awarded her a women's contract for the 2018–19 season. In August 2019, she was named as both the Women's ODI and Women's T20I Player of the Year by Cricket West Indies. In September 2020, in the last match against England, Dottin became the first cricketer to hit 100 sixes in WT20Is. In July 2022, Dottin announced her retirement from international cricket.

Early life and education
Dottin was born in Barbados, and spent most of her childhood in Rock Hall, a village in the parish of St Andrew. Her father died when she was 12 years old, and she was raised primarily by her mother, Melva. Dottin's brothers, grandparents and uncles all lived in Rock Hall. Another relative, her cousin Ottis Gibson, was a medium pace bowler for the West Indies in the 1990s, and has since been a coach of a number of high profile teams.

As a young child, Dottin focused her sporting attention on track and field athletics. Initially, she was a sprinter. Over time, her specialty became the javelin throw, and she was also prominent in shot put and discus throw events. At that stage of her life, cricket was just a pastime; she played informal games with her brothers and other boys in the neighbourhood.

Dottin also attended St James Secondary School (now Frederick Smith Secondary School), at Trents in the parish of St James.

Between 2005 and 2007, Dottin competed successfully in the youth level (U-17), and in 2008 she medalled in the junior level (U-20), of the CARIFTA Games, an annual athletics competition founded by the Caribbean Free Trade Association (CARIFTA). Her most outstanding CARIFTA was the 2007 event, at which she won a record-breaking three gold medals, in discus throw, javelin throw and shot put, respectively. However, in the aftermath of that event she came to feel disillusioned at what she felt was a lack of support from the Barbadian track and field governing body.

By then, Dottin had begun playing cricket formally, as a 14 year old. She had been spotted by another West Indies player, Pamela Lavine, while playing a recreational game. Although her mother had been resistant to her playing cricket, Dottin had wanted to try something else. The high level of fitness she had developed as a track and field athlete was an important factor in her rise through the cricketing ranks. Before long, the task of balancing the two sports became too difficult for Dottin, and she chose cricket, probably because she had "... started to grow a love for the game".

Cricket career

International debut
Dottin made her international cricket debut in 2008, when she was selected as part of the West Indies squad to tour Europe.  Playing in the opening WODI of the tour, Dottin bowled two overs without taking a wicket, allowing eleven runs to be scored.  In the West Indies reply, she top-scored with an unbeaten 33 as her team chased the total down in under 20 overs. She scored her first half-century in international cricket in her fourth ODI, making 66 having opened the batting against Netherlands. She completed the tour of Europe with 149 ODI runs at a batting average of 29.80, second among the West Indians in both areas, trailing Stafanie Taylor. She continued to open the innings during the tour of Sri Lanka, averaging 18.20, but struggled from the same position in the first two matches of the 2009 Women's Cricket World Cup, and after failing to make double figures in either match, was dropped down the batting order to number five. The move immediately paid off as she scored 51 in the next match, against hosts Australia and then 23 against both Pakistan and England in the following matches, though she finished the tournament with low-scores against India and Pakistan.

2010 World Twenty20
In the opening match of the 2010 ICC Women's World Twenty20, Dottin scored the first Women's Twenty20 International century, scoring 112 not out against South Africa at Warner Park, St. Kitts. Coming into bat at number six in the tenth over, Dottin made her first 50 runs in 25 balls, and then moved from 50 to 100 in a further 13 balls.  In total, she hit seven 4s and nine 6s in the innings, propelling the West Indies to a match-winning total. In addition to being the first century in women's Twenty20 Internationals, her 38-ball century is the fastest by any female batsman in a Twenty20 International. The fastest century scored for a male batsman is by Chris Gayle, who scored his century in just 30 deliveries in IPL 2013 against Pune Warriors India.

2018 World Twenty20
In October 2018, she was named in the West Indies' squad for the 2018 ICC Women's World Twenty20 tournament in the West Indies. In the West Indies' opening match of the tournament, against Bangladesh, Dottin took five wickets for five runs to take her first five-wicket haul in WT20Is. The West Indies went on to win the game by 60 runs, with Dottin named as the player of the match. She was the leading run-scorer and wicket-taker for the West Indies in the tournament, with 121 runs and ten wickets in five matches. Following the conclusion of the tournament, she was named as the standout player in the team by the International Cricket Council (ICC).

2020 World Twenty20 and beyond

In January 2020, she was named in West Indies' squad for the 2020 ICC Women's T20 World Cup in Australia. She came back into the team after a long period on the sidelines with a shoulder injury. During the tournament, she had a horror run, and the team was eliminated in the group stage. In November 2020, Dottin was nominated for the ICC Women's T20I Cricketer of the Decade award. In September 2021, in the third match against South Africa, Dottin scored her 3,000th run in WODI cricket.

In October 2021, she was named in the West Indies team for the 2021 Women's Cricket World Cup Qualifier tournament in Zimbabwe. In February 2022, she was named in the West Indies team for the 2022 Women's Cricket World Cup in New Zealand. In the team's first match of the tournament, against New Zealand, she bowled a match-winning final over at her own insistence; in its second match, against England, she took an outstanding catch at backward point to help the team to a seven run victory. She also made her mark on every other match of the group stage.

In April 2022, she was bought by the Manchester Originals for the 2022 season of The Hundred in England. She was later signed by North West Thunder for the 2022 Rachael Heyhoe Flint Trophy.

In May 2022, Dottin was recruited to play in the privately-run 2022 FairBreak Invitational T20 in Dubai, United Arab Emirates. She was allocated to the Barmy Army team. In July 2022, she was named in the Barbados team for the cricket tournament at the 2022 Commonwealth Games in Birmingham, England.

International centuries

One Day International centuries

T20 International centuries

Athletics career
Growing up, Dottin was also active and successful in track and field, winning medals for Barbados at international meetings.  Starting at the age of 14 years, she competed in the youth level (U-17) of the CARIFTA Games winning one silver in 2005, one gold and one silver in 2006, and three gold medals in 2007.

Achievements in Athletics

Personal life
Dottin's self-proclaimed nickname is "World Boss", a moniker also used by Chris Gayle until he moved on to "Universe Boss". During the 2022 FairBreak Invitational T20 tournament, she wore a shirt with "World Boss" on the back instead of her surname.

References

External links

 
 
Deandra Dottin Brisbane Heat Profile

1991 births
Living people
Barbadian women cricketers
Barbadian javelin throwers
West Indian women cricketers
West Indies women One Day International cricketers
West Indies women Twenty20 International cricketers
Lancashire Thunder cricketers
Perth Scorchers (WBBL) cricketers
Brisbane Heat (WBBL) cricketers
Adelaide Strikers (WBBL) cricketers
IPL Trailblazers cricketers
London Spirit cricketers
IPL Supernovas cricketers
North West Thunder cricketers
Manchester Originals cricketers
Trinbago Knight Riders (WCPL) cricketers
Cricketers at the 2022 Commonwealth Games
Commonwealth Games competitors for Barbados
Barbados women Twenty20 International cricketers
Barbadian expatriate sportspeople in Australia
Barbadian expatriate sportspeople in England
Barbadian expatriate sportspeople in India
Barbadian expatriate sportspeople in Trinidad and Tobago